Julia Parker Wightman (December 25, 1909 – July 11, 1994) was an American bibliophile and book collector.

Biography 
Julia Parker Wightman was born on December 25, 1909; she was the daughter of prominent New York City physician Dr. Orrin Sage Wightman (1873-1965) and Purl Parker. She was noted for her impressive collection of rare books. The collection was especially known for its miniature books and children's books, but also included herbals, incunabula, illuminated manuscripts, and fine bindings.

In 1965, following her father's death, she converted his offices at the family home into a bindery, where she created bindings and cases for some of the volumes in her library. She had previously studied bookbinding with Edith Diehl.

She was a longtime member of the Hroswitha Club, which she joined in 1955. She later served as its president from 1978 to 1994, and often hosted club meetings at her home. She was also a member of the Grolier Club; she was elected in 1977, and was one of the first women to be admitted.

After Wightman's death on July 11, 1994, her collections (as well as her bookbinding equipment) were bequeathed to the Morgan Library & Museum. She had been a fellow of the Morgan for forty years, and a trustee for over two decades.

References

1909 births
1994 deaths
Book and manuscript collectors
American bibliophiles
Place of birth missing
Place of death missing